Kent Ingar Karlsen (born 17 February 1973) is a retired Norwegian footballer and football agent.

Hailing from Sørum, Karlsen joined regional giants Lillestrøm to play on the highest tier in Norway. In the latter half of 1998 he was loaned to HamKam, and the move was made permanent for HamKam's 1995 Tippeligaen campaign. Ahead of the 1996 season he joined Vålerenga, winning the 1997 Norwegian Football Cup Final.

In the latter half of 1998 he was loaned to Ikast FS in Denmark, managed by Norwegian Even Pellerud, then to FK Haugesund from March to August 2000. After the 2000 season concluded, Karlsen went to England and Luton Town F.C. He made his debut on 4 November 2000 against Bury, and played his last game on 5 May 2001 against Port Vale. After a period without playing he signed for second-tier club Åsane in Bergen, In 2003 he went on to FK Tønsberg, retiring after the 2004 season and settling in a house in Eik. He started working as a player agent.

References

1973 births
Living people
People from Sørum
Norwegian footballers
Lillestrøm SK players
Hamarkameratene players
Vålerenga Fotball players
Ikast FS players
FK Haugesund players
Luton Town F.C. players
Åsane Fotball players
FK Tønsberg players
Eliteserien players
Norwegian First Division players
Norwegian expatriate footballers
English Football League players
Expatriate footballers in England
Norwegian expatriate sportspeople in England
Danish 1st Division players
Expatriate men's footballers in Denmark
Norwegian expatriate sportspeople in Denmark
Association football defenders
Association football agents
Sportspeople from Viken (county)